"One Touch" is a song by English musicians Jess Glynne and Jax Jones. The collaboration was released as a standalone single on 24 May 2019 through Atlantic Records. The song was added to Jones' debut EP Snacks, appearing on later editions, and was also included as a Streaming bonus track off of Glynne's second studio album Always In Between (2018). The song was later certified Gold by the BPI in the United Kingdom in August 2020 for selling 400,000 units in the country.

Promotion
Glynne confirmed the collaboration in a video posted to Twitter, where she sang part of the song ("Will you catch me when I'm weightless / Pull me close before the crazy come"), tagging Jones and captioning it "#OneTouch". Jones jokingly responded that he was "putting something together", and soon after posted a video of himself playing part of the song on a keyboard along with a link to pre-save the song.

Music video
The accompanying video promotes the fostering of children in care. It features a story about a teenage girl and a younger boy who enter a care home at the same time, and look out for each other. Towards the end of the video, they 'meet' Glynne and Jones, before both are fostered by separate families.

Charts

Certifications

References

2019 singles
2019 songs
Jax Jones songs
Jess Glynne songs
Songs written by Jin Jin (musician)
Songs written by Jess Glynne
Songs written by Jax Jones
Song recordings produced by Mark Ralph (record producer)
Song recordings produced by Jax Jones